The Banggai scops owl (Otus mendeni) is an owl found on Banggai Island and Sula Island of Indonesia.

It was formerly considered a subspecies of the Sulawesi scops owl (Otus manadensis), but was split as a distinct species by the IOC in 2021.

References

Banggai scops owl
Banggai scops owl